Pavlos Dimitriou (born 24 March 1957) is a Greek football manager and former player who played as a midfielder.

Playing career
Dimitriou started at the age of 12 as a left back from the academies of Panserraikos and in 1975 he was promoted to the first team. A year later he became already the captain of the team, while his virtues with the ball at his feet "forced" his coaches to place him in as a midfielder. Dimitriou had amazing seasons and his left foot was the envied by many. He served the "Lions" for 16 consecutive years, when in December 1985 he was called by AEK Athens of Jacek Gmoch. Dimitriou, away from his environment, found it difficult to perform, while AEK of that time was also in a very strange situation, a fact that is exacerbated by the Chrysovitsianou case against his former club. He ended his spell at AEK in 1987 and returned to Panserraikos at the age of 30. Two years later and due to an injury that left him out of action for 4 months, he moved to Nigrita where he ended his career in 1990.

Managerial career
Almost immediately after retiring as a footballer, Dimitriou became a coach with important terms in Panserraikos both in the infrastructure departments and in the first team.

References

External links

1957 births
Living people
Greek footballers
Footballers from Serres
Association football midfielders
Panserraikos F.C. players
AEK Athens F.C. players
Greek football managers
Panserraikos F.C. managers
Apollon Paralimnio F.C. managers